Jafarabad (also Romanized as Ja‘farābād; also known as Ja‘farābād-e Chamcham) is a village in Parsinah Rural District, in the Central District of Sonqor County, Kermanshah Province, Iran. At the 2006 census, its population was 444, in 85 families.

References 

Populated places in Sonqor County